Lanier Township is one of the twelve townships of Preble County, Ohio, United States.  The 2000 census found 3,931 people in the township, 3,052 of whom lived in the unincorporated portions of the township.

Geography
Located in the southeastern part of the county, it borders the following townships:
Twin Township - north
Perry Township, Montgomery County - northeast corner
Jackson Township, Montgomery County - east
German Township, Montgomery County - southeast corner
Gratis Township - south
Somers Township - southwest corner
Gasper Township - west
Washington Township - northwest

Part of the village of West Alexandria is located in northern Lanier Township.

Name and history
Lanier Township was founded in 1811, and named for Alexander C. Lanier, an early settler in Preble County. It is the only Lanier Township statewide.

Government
The township is governed by a three-member board of trustees, who are elected in November of odd-numbered years to a four-year term beginning on the following January 1. Two are elected in the year after the presidential election and one is elected in the year before it. There is also an elected township fiscal officer, who serves a four-year term beginning on April 1 of the year after the election, which is held in November of the year before the presidential election. Vacancies in the fiscal officership or on the board of trustees are filled by the remaining trustees.

References

External links
County website

Townships in Preble County, Ohio
Townships in Ohio